The Festival du Film de Paris, also known as Paris Film Festival, was a film festival held annually in Paris, France. It was launched in 1986 as a youth-oriented festival. In 2002, the municipal government withdrew funding and began Festival Paris Cinéma. It continued through 2007 as Festival du Film de Paris Ile-de-France.

References

External links
Paris Film Festival at the Internet Movie Database
Festival du Film de Paris via archive.org
Festival du Film de Paris - Ile-de-France via archive.org

Film festivals in Paris